The men's shot put event at the 2000 Summer Olympics as part of the athletics program was held at the Olympic Stadium on Friday, 22 September. The shot put has been ever present since the beginning of the modern Olympic Games in 1896. Thirty-seven athletes from 27 nations competed. The maximum number of athletes per nation had been set at 3 since the 1930 Olympic Congress. The qualifying athletes progressed through to the final where the qualifying distances were scrapped and they started afresh with up to six throws. The event was won by Arsi Harju of Finland, the nation's first victory in the men's shot put since 1920 (and second overall) and first medal in the event since 1936. Americans Adam Nelson and John Godina took silver and bronze, respectively, with Godina becoming the 12th man to earn multiple shot put medals (adding to his 1996 silver).

Background

This was the 24th appearance of the event, which is one of 12 athletics events to have been held at every Summer Olympics. The returning finalists from the 1996 Games were silver medalist John Godina of the United States, fourth-place finisher Paolo Dal Soglio of Italy, fifth-place finisher Oliver-Sven Buder of Germany, sixth-place finisher Roman Virastyuk of Ukraine, eighth-place finisher (and 1992 finalist) Dragan Perić of Yugoslavia, and tenth-place finisher Bilal Saad Mubarak of Qatar. Godina, the 1995 and 1997 world champion, had finished fourth in the U.S. trials and was able to compete only as a replacement for C.J. Hunter (reigning world champion and 1996 Olympic seventh-place finisher), who was disqualified before competing.

Croatia, Cuba, Moldova, and Slovakia each made their debut in the men's shot put. The United States made its 23rd appearance, most of any nation, having missed only the boycotted 1980 Games.

Qualification

Each National Olympic Committee was permitted to enter up to three athletes that had thrown 19.70 metres or further during the qualification period. The maximum number of athletes per nation had been set at 3 since the 1930 Olympic Congress. If an NOC had no athletes that qualified under that standard, one athlete that had thrown 19.30 metres or further could be entered.

Competition format

The competition used the two-round format introduced in 1936, with the qualifying round completely separate from the divided final. In qualifying, each athlete received three attempts; those recording a mark of at least 20.10 metres advanced to the final. If fewer than 12 athletes achieved that distance, the top 12 would advance. The results of the qualifying round were then ignored. Finalists received three throws each, with the top eight competitors receiving an additional three attempts. The best distance among those six throws counted.

Records

These were the standing world and Olympic records (in meters) prior to the 2000 Summer Olympics.

No new world or Olympic records were set during the competition. The following national records were set during the competition:

Schedule

All times are Australian Eastern Standard Time (UTC+10)

Results

Qualifying

The qualifying round was held on Friday, 22 September 2000. The qualifying distance was 20.10 m. For all qualifiers who did not achieve the standard, the remaining spaces in the final were filled by the longest throws until a total of 12 qualifiers.

Final

References

External links
todor66
Official Report of the 2000 Sydney Summer Olympics

Athletics at the 2000 Summer Olympics
Shot put at the Olympics
Men's events at the 2000 Summer Olympics